Secchi is a crater in the Hellas quadrangle of Mars, located at 58.3° south latitude and 258.1° west longitude.  it is 223 km in diameter and was named after Angelo Secchi, an Italian astronomer (1818–1878).

The smaller craters Tikhov and Wallace are located to the northeast of Secchi.

See also 
 List of craters on Mars

References 

Hellas quadrangle
Impact craters on Mars